Klyuchiki is the name of several rural localities in Russia:
Klyuchiki, Amur Oblast, a selo in Seryshevsky District, Amur Oblast
Klyuchiki (Kultayevskoye Rural Settlement), Permsky District, Perm Krai, a village in Permsky District, Perm Krai